This list tracks and ranks the population of the top 10 largest cities and other urban places in Mexico by decade, as reported by each Mexican Population Census, starting with the 1921 Census.

This list generally refers only to the population of individual localities within their defined limits at the time of the indicated census. Some of these places have since been annexed or merged into other cities, while others may have expanded their borders due to such consolidation. One example is the 1928 integration of several municipalities into Mexico City.

1921 
There is no information at locality level from the first three population censuses, completed in 1895, 1900, and 1910.

Because of the Mexican Revolution, the 1920 census was postponed a year. At that time, Mexico City was already the most populated city in the country, even if it only covered what is now the Cuauhtémoc borough. Tacubaya, a neighboring independent city in present's day Miguel Hidalgo borough, was among the Top 10 localities, along with the most developed commercial and industrial cities at that time.

The total population of these 10 cities was 1,292,876.

1930 

The total population of these 10 cities was 1,896,343.

1940 

The total population of these 10 cities was 2,492,913.

1950 

The total population of these 10 cities was 3,900,568.

1960 

The total population of these 10 cities was 5,612,165.

1970 

The total population of these 10 cities was 7,523,672.

1980 

The total population of these 10 cities was 17,037,280.

1990 

The total population of these 10 cities was 17,531,574.

2000 

The total population of these 10 cities was 19,780,692.

2010 

The total population of these 10 cities was 20,678,868.

2020 

The total population of these 10 cities was 22,146,602.

See also 
List of cities in Mexico
Metropolitan areas of Mexico
List of Mexican states by population
Demographics of Mexico

References 

 

Mexico
Mexico
Cities
Mexico
Subdivisions of Mexico